Thathai Bhatias is a Chandarvanshi Rajput clan like most of the bhatias settled in India. This clan has it origins from the time of Maharaja Jaiswal in Jaisalmer and during the time of British they migrated to Sindh and then after many years during the time of independence they migrated to India from the Thatta District, Sindh after independence of Pakistan in 1947.
Pre-independence, in 1880s the Bhatias were considered amongst the top three Indian communities undertaking trading relations with Middle East countries like Bahrain, Qatar and Oman .

See also
 Thathai Bhatia Cuisine

References

Social groups of India
Rajput clans
Social groups of Sindh
Social groups of Maharashtra
Sindhi tribes
Sindhi tribes in India